Daihachi (written: 大八) is a masculine Japanese given name. Notable people with the name include:

, Japanese drummer
, Japanese film director

Japanese masculine given names